The Fucaceae are a family of brown algae, containing six genera:
Ascophyllum Stackhouse – one species
Fucus L. – 15 species
Hesperophycus Setchell & Gardner – one species
Pelvetia Decne. & Thur. – one species
Pelvetiopsis N.L.Gardner – two species
Silvetia E.Serrão, T.O.Cho, S.M.Boo & S.H.Brawley – three species

References

 
Brown algae families